Ilene Shapiro (born 1947) is an American businessperson and politician.  She has served as the Executive of Summit County, Ohio since August 1, 2016. Her predecessor Russell M. Pry died in office on July 31, 2016. She was elected in 2016 and re-elected in 2020 and is currently serving a four-year term that ends in December 2024.  Previously, Shapiro was a member of Summit County Council for ten years and Council President for three years. Prior to her time in public service, Shapiro was a businesswoman.

Business Career 
Before her time on County Council, Shapiro was a businesswoman and a small business owner. She was an executive at First Merit Bank and the Summa Health Foundation. She later became an entrepreneur, and created a beauty supply company and consultancy firm based in Akron. Shapiro was the head of Shapiro Consulting, a business consulting firm.

Summit County Council

Council Member at-Large 
Shapiro was elected to Summit County Council in 2006 as an at-large councilmember. She served as the chair of the planning and economic development committee for her seven years.

Council President 
Shapiro was elected council president in 2014.

Interim County Executive 
As President of County Council, Ilene Shapiro was next in line for County Executive. When Executive Russ Pry died in 2016, she was named Interim County Executive on August 1, 2016. The Summit County Democratic Party then voted and selected her to complete the remainder of Pry's term and to replace him on the ballot in November 2016. During her first few weeks as County Executive, Shapiro sought to continue the initiatives started by the late Russ Pry.

2016 Election 
In 2016, most Democrats in Summit County won their elections against their Republican rivals. Shapiro faced Bill Roemer (R) in the general election. Shapiro won 58.94% of the vote compared to Roemer's 41.06%. Her term ends December 31, 2020.

Shapiro ran a campaign focused on economic development, workforce training, and diversity inclusion. Her campaign planned to continue and expand upon the work of Russ Pry.

County Executive

Economic Development 
Shapiro made economic development and workforce training a priority of her first term in office. The county is attempting to attract businesses-small and large- to the region. In March 2019, the county launched its new Economic Development Tool, Summit4Success. A website aimed at increasing business relocation to Summit County. This website also allows for individuals to connect with economic development employees of the county.

Veterans Services 
Executive Shapiro announced the creation of Summit Liberty House, a shelter for veteran women in Summit county, at the 2018 State of the County. The project was completed in September of 2019.

Opioid Crisis 
In October 2017, Executive Shapiro announced plans to sue the companies that make and distribute addictive painkillers. She declared a state of emergency in the county and said the opioid epidemic has cost taxpayers $112 million from 2012 to 2017. In 2019, Summit County and Cuyahoga County reached a settlement with several large pharmaceutical companies for $260 million; Summit County received $104 million in total. Executive Shapiro then directed the creation of the Opiate Abatement Advisory Council (OAAC) to oversee the immediate and future distribution of the funds.

In addition to the lawsuit responding to the crisis, Executive Shapiro facilitated the gifting of land that was once the Edwin Shaw rehab hospital to two nonprofits that aim to combat the opioid crisis, Restore Addiction Recovery and Hope United.

2020 Election 
In 2020, Shapiro faced John Chapman (R) in the general election. Shapiro won 58.04% of the vote compared to Chapman's 41.96%.

Awards and recognition 
Shapiro received the "Women in Business Advocate" from the U.S. Small Business Administration and received the Athena Award from ATHENA International prior to her time as County Executive.

References 

1947 births
Living people
County executives in Ohio
21st-century American women politicians
21st-century American politicians
American company founders
American women company founders
American women business executives
20th-century American businesspeople
21st-century American businesspeople
Ohio Democrats
20th-century American businesswomen
21st-century American businesswomen